Gregorio Marañón y Posadillo, OWL (19 May 1887 in Madrid – 27 March 1960 in Madrid) was a Spanish physician, scientist, historian, writer and philosopher. He married Dolores Moya in 1911, and they had four children (Carmen, Belén, María Isabel and Gregorio).

Life and work 
An austere, humanist and liberal man, he is considered one of the most brilliant Spanish intellectuals of the 20th century. Besides his erudition, he also stands out for his elegant literary style. As many other thinkers of his time, he involved himself socially and politically: he was a Republican and fought the Miguel Primo de Rivera dictatorship (he was condemned to jail for a month) and showed his disagreement with Spanish communism. Moreover, he supported the Second Spanish Republic in its beginnings, but later criticised it because of its lack of cohesion among the Spanish people.

Probably after going away from Madrid (around January 1937), and when asked his opinion of republican Spain, Marañón spoke in a meeting of French intellectuals as follows: "You don't need to try very hard, my friends; listen to this: eighty-eight percent of teachers from Madrid, Valencia and Barcelona (the three universities which, alongside Murcia's, had stayed on the republican side) have been forced to exile abroad. And do you know why? Simply because they were afraid of being murdered by the reds (communists in Spain), despite many of the threatened intellectuals were thought of as left-wing men."

In the article "Liberalism and Communism", published in Revue de Paris on 15 December 1937, he clearly expressed his change of opinion towards the Second Republic:

From December 1936 to autumn of 1942, Marañón lived abroad, in a de facto exile. Back in Spain again, the dictatorship (as it did with other intellectuals) used his figure to improve its exterior image. In overall terms, the Francoist state respected him. Miguel Artola, in 1987, stated that the biggest political contribution of Marañón was clearly having raised the flag of freedom, in a time where no one or only a few could do it, understanding liberalism as the opposite to a specific political position. In this sense, he would state:

His experience as a kind of insider served his knowledge about the Spanish state. After the students riot of 1956, he led, along with Menéndez Pidal, protests denouncing the dire political situation under Francoist rule, asking for the return of those exiled.

His early contribution to Medicine was focused on endocrinology, in fact him being one of its forefathers. During his first year of graduate school (1909) he published seven works in the Clinical Magazine of Madrid, of which only one was related to endocrinology, about the autoimmune polyendocrine syndrome. In 1910, he published five works, two of them related to endocrinology, about the Addison disease. In following years, his attraction to endocrinology only grew larger. In 1930 he published Endocrinology (printed in Madrid by Espasa-Calpe) and thirty more works in scientific journals on that speciality, of which half were works as the only author, which is remarkable taking into account the political-historical context in which Marañón was directly or indirectly involved.  He wrote the first treatise of internal medicine in Spain, along with Doctor Hernando, and his book Manual of Etiologic Diagnostic (1946) was one of the most widespread medicine books in the world, because of its new focus on the study of diseases and its copious and unprecedented clinical contributions.

Beyond his intense dedication to medicine, he wrote about other topics, such as history, art, travels, cooking, clothing, hairstyle, or shoes.
In his works he analysed, creating the unique and unprecedented genre of "biological essays", the great human passions through historical characters, and their psychic and physiopathologic features: shyness in his book Amiel, resentment in Tiberio, power in The Count-Duke of Olivares, intrigue and treason in politics in Antonio Pérez (one of the makers of the Spanish "black legend"), the "donjuanism" in Don Juan, etc.
He was inducted and collaborated in five of the eight Spanish Real Academies.

The blueprint of Marañón is, in the opinion of Ramón Menéndez Pidal, "indelible", on both the science domain and the relationships he built with his peers. Pedro Laín Entralgo recognised as far as five different personalities in this great doctor from Madrid: the doctor Marañón; the writer Marañón; the historian Marañón, that greatly contributed to his "universality"; the moralist Marañón; and the Spanish Marañón. What makes his work even more singular is the "human" perspective that summarizes the multiplicity of domains that he is involved in, partaking in the scientific, ethical, moral, religious, cultural, and historic.

He was a doctor for the Royal House, and for plenty of well-known people from the social life in Spain, but above it all he was a "beneficence doctor" (or of attention to the poorest people) at the Hospital Provincial de Madrid, nowadays called Hospital General Universitario Gregorio Marañón, where in 1911 was appointed at his own request in the unit of infectious diseases. Along with this hospital, the biggest in Madrid, his name stands today on several streets and educational institutions all over Spain.

Foundation 
The Gregorio Marañón Foundation was established on 11 November 1988, with the aim of "perpetuate the thinking and work of Doctor Marañón, spread the high magistrature of Medicine he worked in and promote research in the fields of Medicine and Bioethics". Furthermore, "it is a cornerstone of the Foundation the localization and recuperation of all the biographic and bibliographic documents to constitute a Documentary Fund available to all the learners who want to analyse and go deeper into the signification and validity of the thinking and work of Gregorio Marañón". A Marañón Week is annually held since 1990.
The Marañón Week of 1999 was devoted to the topic of emotion, in 2000, held in Oviedo, was devoted to Benito Jerónimo Feijoo, in 2001, to the figure of don Juan, in 2002, held in the University Hospital Complex of Albacete, to the "Medical Work of Marañón", in 2006, held in Valencia, to "Luis Vives: Spanish humanist in Europe" and in 2009, to the "liberal tradition".
On 9 July 2010 the José Ortega y Gasset Foundation and the Gregorio Marañón Foundation fused, creating a sole organization: the José Ortega y Gasset-Gregorio Marañón Foundation, also known as the Ortega-Marañón Foundation. However, the website of the new foundation, which still stands as http://www.ortegaygasset.edu, barely reveals any activity or interest related to Marañón.

Ateneo of Madrid 
It could be taken into consideration that it was not the Foundation, but the Ateneo of Madrid, who celebrated the 50th anniversary of the death of Marañón, on 19 October 2010. In 1924 Marañón "had been promoted to president of the Ateneo by acclamation of his partners, that viewed him as his true president, but his presidency was de facto because the dictatorship of Primo de Rivera did not allow the electoral session. After the factious assembly , not recognised by the associates, Marañón was appointed as president of the Ateneo in March of 1930."

Legacy 
Marañón’s sign is named after him, a clinical sign that increases the suspicion of a substernal goiter in patients.

Books 
 Tiberius: A Study in Resentment (1956) – translated from Tiberio: Historia de un resentimiento (1939)

References

External links
 

1887 births
1960 deaths
People from Madrid
Members of the Congress of Deputies of the Second Spanish Republic
Spanish male writers
20th-century Spanish philosophers
20th-century Spanish physicians
Members of the Royal Spanish Academy
Complutense University of Madrid alumni
Exiles of the Spanish Civil War in Argentina
Exiles of the Spanish Civil War in Uruguay
Exiles of the Spanish Civil War in France
20th-century male writers
Eugenics in Spain